Existential counselling is a philosophical form of counselling which addresses the situation of a person's life and situates the person firmly within the predictable challenges of the human condition. 

Well known authors on existential counselling are Irvin Yalom in the USA through his book Existential Psychotherapy (1981),  and Emmy van Deurzen, who created the British School and published Existential Counselling and Psychotherapy in 1988.

Dimensions of living
Existential counselling considers human living to take place in confrontation with three different dimensions – external world; other people; inner world. Others would nominate four dimensions: physical, social, psychological and spiritual.  Each of these dimensions can be seen as constituted like a force field, within which predictable paradoxes, tensions and dilemmas play out. Human beings can learn to deal with these tensions and conflicts more effectively by facing up to the negatives as well as the positives of their lives, including the tensions of life and death, love and hate, strength and weakness and meaning and absurdity.

Personal element
Existential counsellors stress the importance of the examined life, and of preparatory work on oneself, in paving the way for effective counselling. Thus in counselling adolescents the counsellor can optimally model an autonomous life based on the making of realistic decisions, but one which also acknowledges the role of failure as well as success in everyday life, and the ongoing and inescapable presence of anxiety.

Research basis

In the debate on evidence-based research in counselling, existential counsellors tend to stress the dangers of over-simplification, and the importance of qualitative as well as quantitative measurements of outcome.  While not necessarily expecting an easy resolution of the specific/non-specific factors in therapy debate, an existential counsellor will nonetheless favor evidence-based practice.

See also

References

Further reading
 D. Langdridge, Existential Counselling and Psychotherapy (2012)

External links
An Introduction to Existential Counselling

Counseling
Existential therapy